The 2016–17 EFL Trophy, known as the Checkatrade Trophy for sponsorship reasons, was the 33rd season in the history of the competition and the first since being rebranded from Football League Trophy. It was played as a knock-out tournament for English football clubs in League One and League Two of the English football system and for the first time was expanded to include 16 Premier League and Championship "B Teams" with Category One status as part of a trial.

In all, 64 clubs entered the competition. Barnsley were the reigning champions, but were ineligible to defend their title following promotion to the Championship.

Change in format
On 9 June 2016, the newly rebranded EFL announced that the 2016–17 EFL Trophy competition would include sixteen "category 1 Premier League academy sides" for the first time. The first knockout round would also be replaced with a new group stage, the sixteen regional groups each to comprise three League One/Two teams plus an academy side, with the top two teams from each group progressing to the knockout second round.

Following the EFL's announcement of these format changes, many of the invited clubs declined to allow their academies to participate, and their places had to filled by the academy sides of several Championship clubs.

Reception to the new format by League One and Two fans was overwhelmingly negative. The opening rounds of fixtures were marked by record low attendances, and the format changes were described as "a complete and utter failure".

Participating clubs
48 clubs from League One and League Two.
16 invited Category One Academy teams.
Category One teams relegated to League One missed out on having academies participating in the following tournament.

Notes 
Arsenal, Liverpool, Manchester United, Manchester City, Newcastle United and Tottenham Hotspur declined to participate.

Eligibility criteria for players
For EFL clubs;  a minimum of 5 'First Team' players in the starting 11 as defined under the competition's existing rules.
For invited clubs – 6 of the starting 11 to be U21 (as at 30 June 2016).

Dates

The competition dates were announced in July 2016.

Group stage

 Sixteen groups of 4 teams will be organised on a regionalised basis.
 All groups will include one invited club and at least one club from each of Leagues One and Two.
 All clubs will play each other once, either home or away (Academies play all group matches away from home).
 Invited clubs will play one home game at the club's first team stadium.
 Clubs will be awarded 3 points for a win and 1 point for a draw.
 In the event of a drawn game (after 90 minutes), a penalty shootout will be held with the winning team earning an additional point.
 The top two teams will progress to the Knockout Stage.

Northern Section

Group A

Group B

Group C

Group D

Group E

Group F

Group G

Group H

Southern Section

Group A

Group B

Group C

Group D

Group E

Group F

Group G

Group H

Knockout stage

If scores are level after 90 minutes in Rounds 2, 3 and 4, the game will be determined by the taking of penalties.

Round 2
The Round 2 draw was made on 10 November 2016. The 32 remaining teams were drawn into 16 ties; each group winner will be at home to a runner-up from a different group within their own region.

Northern Section

Southern Section

Round 3
The Round 3 draw was made on 8 December 2016. The 16 remaining teams were drawn into 8 ties as a "free draw."

Quarter-finals
The Quarter-final draw took place on 12 January 2017. The 8 remaining teams were drawn into 4 ties as a "free draw."

Semi-finals
The Semi-final draw took place on 26 January 2017. The 4 remaining teams were drawn into 2 ties as a "free draw."

Final

Match proceeds

After deduction of match expenses, all proceeds were split: 
45% Home club 
45% Away club 
10% to the pool account

Notes

References

External links

EFL Trophy
England
Trophy